Hessel station is a railway station serving the southern part of the town and seapor of Grenaa on the Djursland peninsula in East Jutland, Denmark.

The station is located on the Grenaa Line between Aarhus and Grenaa. It opened in 2019 shortly after the opening of the Aarhus Light Rail service on the Grenaa Line.

See also
 List of railway stations in Denmark

References

External links

 Aarhus Letbane
 Midttrafik

Grenaa
Railway stations opened in 2019
Railway stations in the Central Denmark Region
2019 establishments in Denmark
Railway stations in Denmark opened in the 21st century